The Adventures of Bottle Top Bill and His Best Friend Corky is an Australian children's animated television program that first aired on ABC2 in 2005, while also airing on Milkshake!, a program block on Channel 5 in the UK. The animation is a mixture of CGI, 2D and stop motion.

Series synopsis
Bottle Top Bill is a man who lives in a town called Junkyardville with his best friend Corky, a horse. The characters and surroundings are made up from everyday bits and pieces, the kind of things someone might throw away without even trying to recycle them, like old boxes, tape, wire mesh and paper. That is why people call the place Junkyardville. Bottle Top Bill and Corky find themselves in different surroundings and meet strange new characters each episode. The stories happen anywhere from ancient Egypt, mythological Greece, the Wild West, to under the sea or in outer space.

Interactive
The series and website are designed to encourage children (3–6 years) to develop their imaginations and creativity by using things they can find around the home.

Episodes

Series 1 (2005–06)

Series 2 (2006–07)

Series 3 (2007–08)

Series 4 (2008–09)

International
United Kingdom: Milkshake! on Channel 5
Canada: Kidoodle TV, TVOKids
Ireland: RTÉ Two
Australia: ABC2, ABC Kids, Boomerang
Philippines: Cartoon Network
India: Pogo
Latin America: Boomerang
Brasil: TV Brasil
New Zealand: TVNZ Kidzone
Singapore: Kids Central, Okto

References

Australian Broadcasting Corporation original programming
Australian children's animated television series
2009 Australian television series endings
Television series by Endemol Australia
2000s Australian animated television series
English-language television shows
2005 Australian television series debuts